Hits'n'Riffs is a compilation album released in November 2015 by Australian band Skyhooks. It followed two weeks after the release of the band's 3CD box set, Don't You Believe What You've Seen or You've Heard

The band made a surprise reformation in early October for RocKwizs Salute to the ARIA Hall of Fame live show. The album was then announced on 6 November 2015 and includes hit singles, classic album tracks, fan favourites and includes the rare "1976 Guitar" all digitally remastered for the first time.

The album features cover artwork from 1970s album cover and poster artist Ian McCausland, and the booklet includes several previously unseen images.

Track listing
 "Living in the 70's" – 3:45
 "Balwyn Calling" – 3:34
 "Horror Movie" – 3:50
 "You Just Like Me 'Cos I'm Good in Bed" – 3:46
 "Ego Is Not a Dirty Word" – 2:56
 "Saturday Night" – 2:50
 "All My Friends Are Getting Married" – 4:49
 "Every Chase a Steeple" – 3:42
 "Blue Jeans" – 2:31
 "Let It Rock" – 2:50
 "Million Dollar Riff" – 3:50
 "This Is My City" – 3:41
 "Somewhere in Sydney" – 3:47
 "Party to End All Parties" – 3:16
 "Why Dontcha All Get Fucked" – 4:03
 "Women in Uniform" – 4:24
 "Jukebox in Siberia" – 3:52
 "1976 Guitar" – 3:57

 All tracks written by Greg Macainsh, except track 7, Red Symons and track 10 Chuck Berry.

Charts
Hits'n'Riffs made its ARIA Chart debut at number 71 following the airing of the Network Seven miniseries Molly in February 2016. The show was the number 1 watched show of the night, with more than 1.8 million viewers. The following week, the album rose to number 32. Skyhooks' music featured prominently in the series.

Weekly charts

Personnel
 Greg Macainsh – bass
 Imants "Fred" Strauks – drums
 Doug Brady – engineering 
 Ern Rose – engineering 
 Greg Henderson – engineering 
 John French – engineering 
 Lee De Carlo – engineering 
 Peter Walker – engineering 
 Bob Spencer – guitar 
 Bob "Bongo" Starkie – guitar 
 Red Symons – guitar 
 Ern Rose – mixing 
 Graeme "Shirley" Strachan – vocals

Release history

References

Skyhooks (band) albums
Compilation albums by Australian artists
2015 compilation albums
Festival Records albums